Aubermesnil-Beaumais is a commune in the Seine-Maritime department in the Normandy region in northern France.

Geography

Population

Places of interest
 The church of St.Paul, dating from the twelfth century.
 The church of St.Laurent at Beaumais, dating from the thirteenth century.
 The château dating from the eighteenth century

See also
Communes of the Seine-Maritime department

References

Communes of Seine-Maritime